The Irish Sport Horse, or Irish Hunter, is an Irish breed of warmblood sporting horse, used mostly for dressage, eventing and show-jumping. It was bred from 1923 by cross-breeding of Irish Draught and Thoroughbred stock. There was some limited intromission of Hanoverian, Selle Français and Trakehner blood in the 1990s. It is a recognised true breed – foals may only be registered in the main section of the stud-book if both parents are registered in that section.

Characteristics

Uses

The Irish Sport Horse is a successful competition riding horse, used in dressage, show-jumping and three-day eventing. The Irish Sport Horse Studbook is often highly placed in the annual eventing rankings of the World Breeding Federation for Sport Horses, and was in first place in each year from 2012 to 2016.

See also 
Successful ISH Eventers
Successful ISH Showjumpers

References

Horse breeds
Horse breeds originating in Ireland